Melpa (also written Medlpa) is a Papuan language spoken by about 130,000 people predominantly in Mount Hagen and the surrounding district of Western Highlands Province, Papua New Guinea.

Melpa is a Pandanus language used during karuka harvest. Melpa has a voiceless velar lateral fricative, written as a double-barred el (Ⱡ, ⱡ). Melpa is notable for its binary counting system. A dictionary of Melpa has been compiled by Stewart, Strathern and Trantow (2011).

Phonology

Consonants

Vowels

Numeral system

Melpa language in films
Temboka, a dialect of Melpa, is the native language of the Ganiga tribe, who featured prominently in the Highlands Trilogy of documentaries by Robin Anderson and Bob Connolly (First Contact, Joe Leahy's Neighbours, and Black Harvest).

The documentary Ongka's Big Moka also has Melpa dialogue.

References

External links
Melpa laterals
Kay Owens. "The Work of Glendon Lean on the Counting Systems of Papua New Guinea and Oceania", section "The Melpa Counting System". Mathematics Education Research Journal vol. 13 (April 2001), 
Melpa Phonology

Chimbu–Wahgi languages
Languages of Western Highlands Province
Pandanus avoidance registers